The sport of football in the East African country of Sudan is managed by the Sudan Football Association. The association administers the national football team, as well as the Premier League. The Sudan Football Association, which was founded in 1946, and FIFA affiliated in 1948, was one of the founding members of the Confederation of African Football, and continues to be a member of the Confederation. Like in many countries, football is the most popular sport also in Sudan.

Since at least 2006, there was also an inofficial Sudan women's national football team, trained by a male coach. Since September 2019, there has been an official national league for women's football clubs that started on the basis of informal women's clubs since the beginning of the 2000s. In 2021, the Sudan women's national football team participated for the first time in the Arab Women's Cup, held in Cairo, Egypt.

Football stadiums in Sudan

See also 

 Sudan men's national football team
 Sudan women's national football team

References

Football in Sudan
Sport in Sudan by sport
Women's sport in Sudan